Gornja Gračenica  is a village in Croatia. It is about 8 kilometers away from Kutina.

References

Populated places in Sisak-Moslavina County